Indra's net (also called Indra's jewels or Indra's pearls, Sanskrit Indrajāla, Chinese: 因陀羅網) is a metaphor used to illustrate the concepts of Śūnyatā (emptiness), pratītyasamutpāda (dependent origination), and interpenetration in Buddhist philosophy.

The metaphor's earliest known reference is found in the Atharva Veda.  It was further developed by the Mahayana school in the 3rd century Buddhāvataṃsaka Sūtra and later by the Huayan school between the 6th and 8th centuries.

In the Buddhāvataṃsaka Sūtra 

"Indra's net" is an infinitely large net owned by the Vedic deva Indra, which hangs over his palace on Mount Meru, the axis mundi of Buddhist and Hindu cosmology. In East Asian Buddhism, Indra's net is considered as having a multifaceted jewel at each vertex, with each jewel being reflected in all of the other jewels. In the Huayan school of Chinese Buddhism, which follows the Buddhāvataṃsaka Sūtra, the image of "Indra's net" is used to describe the interconnectedness or "perfect interfusion" (yuanrong, 圓融) of all phenomena in the universe.

Francis H. Cook describes Indra's net thus:

The Buddha in the Buddhāvataṃsaka Sūtra'''s 30th book states a similar idea:If untold Buddha-lands are reduced to atoms,
In one atom are untold lands, and as in one, so in each.
The atoms to which these Buddha-lands are reduced in an instant are unspeakable,
And so are the atoms of continuous reduction moment to moment, going on for untold eons;
These atoms contain lands unspeakably many, and the atoms in these lands are even harder to tell of.

Book 30 of the Buddhāvataṃsaka is named "The Incalculable" because it focuses on the idea of the infinitude of the universe and as Thomas Cleary notes, concludes that "the cosmos is unutterably infinite, and hence so is the total scope and detail of knowledge and activity of enlightenment." 

In another part of the Buddhāvataṃsaka sutra, the actual metaphor of "Indra's Net" is used to refer to the all phenomena in the dharmadhātu ("dharma realm", ultimate reality, the ultimate principle, Chinese: 法界中):They [Buddhas] know all phenomena come from interdependent origination.

They know all world systems exhaustively. They know all the different phenomena in all worlds, interrelated in Indra's net.

In Huayan texts

The metaphor of Indra's net of jewels plays an essential role in the metaphysics of the Chinese Buddhist Huayan school, where it is used to describe the interpenetration or "perfect interfusion" (Chinese:yuanrong, 圓融) of microcosmos and macrocosmos, as well as the interfusion of all dharmas (phenomena) in the entire universe. According to Bryan Van Norden, in the Huayan tradition, Indra's net is "adopted as a metaphor for the manner in which each thing that exists is dependent for both its existence and its identity upon every other thing that exists."

The Huayan text entitled "Calming and Contemplation in the Five Teachings of Huayan" (Huayan wujiao zhiguan 華嚴五教止觀, T1867) attributed to the first Huayan patriarch Dushun (557–640) gives an extended overview of this concept:
The manner in which all dharmas interpenetrate is like an imperial net of celestial jewels extending in all directions infinitely, without limit. … As for the imperial net of heavenly jewels, it is known as Indra’s Net, a net which is made entirely of jewels. Because of the clarity of the jewels, they are all reflected in and enter into each other, ad infinitum. Within each jewel, simultaneously, is reflected the whole net. Ultimately, nothing comes or goes. If we now turn to the southwest, we can pick one particular jewel and
examine it closely. This individual jewel can immediately reflect the image
of every other jewel. 

As is the case with this jewel, this is furthermore the case with all the rest of the jewels–each and every jewel simultaneously and immediately reflects each and every other jewel, ad infinitum. The image of each of these limitless jewels is within one jewel, appearing brilliantly. None of the other jewels interfere with this. When one sits within one jewel, one is simultaneously sitting in all the infinite jewels in all ten directions. How is this so? Because within each jewel are present all jewels. If all jewels are present within each jewel, it is also the case that if you sit in one jewel you sit in all jewels at the same time. The inverse is also understood in the same way. Just as one goes into one jewel and thus enters every other jewel while never leaving this one jewel, so too one enters any jewel while never leaving this particular jewel.

The Huayan Patriarch Fazang (643–712) used the golden statue of a lion to demonstrate the Huayan vision of interpenetration to empress Wu:

Indra and Atharva Veda

According to Rajiv Malhotra, the earliest reference to a net belonging to Indra is in the Atharva Veda (c. 1000 BCE). Verse 8.8.6. says: 

And verse 8.8.8. says:

The net was one of the weapons of the sky-god Indra, used to snare and entangle enemies. The net also signifies magic or illusion. According to Teun Goudriaan, Indra is conceived in the Rig Veda as a great magician, tricking his enemies with their own weapons, thereby continuing human life and prosperity on earth. Indra became associated with earthly magic, as reflected in the term indrajal, "Indra's Net", the name given to the occult practices magicians. According to Goudriaan, the term indrajalam seems to originate in verse 8.8.8 from the Atharva Veda, of which Goudriaan gives a different translation:

According to Goudriaan, the speaker pretends to use a weapon of cosmical size. The net being referred to here 

Modern and Western references

Gödel, Escher, Bach
In Gödel, Escher, Bach (1979), Douglas Hofstadter uses Indra's net as a metaphor for the complex interconnected networks formed by relationships between objects in a system—including social networks, the interactions of particles, and the "symbols" that stand for ideas in a brain or intelligent computer.

Vermeer's Hat
Timothy Brook uses the metaphor:

Sarah Burton explains that Brook uses the metaphor, and its interconnectedness, 

Brave New World

In the 2020 TV Series Brave New World inspired by the homonymous book by Aldous Huxley, a new element is introduced in the original story: everyone in New London is always connected to an artificial intelligence called Indra, that observes, monitors and analyzes all citizens 24/7. Writer Grant Morrison named this network after the Vedic deity, since Huxley was famously fascinated by Indian mysticism and named another element of the story, Soma, after a Hindu ritual drink which shares its name with another Vedic deity.

Indra's Net: Defending Hinduism's Philosophical Unity
In Indra's Net'' (2014), Rajiv Malhotra uses the image of Indra's net as a metaphor for

Midnight Gospel

In the TV Series Midnight Gospel 2020, Indra's Net is discussed in the episode Annihilation of Joy where prisoners die over and over.

See also
 Brahmajala Sutra
 Coincidentia oppositorum
 Fazang
 Hosshin Kingdom
 Indra's thunderbolt
 Macrocosm and microcosm
 Metamodernism
 Rhizome (philosophy)
 Śakra (Buddhism)
 The Net (substance)
 Three Spheres II

References

Sources

Published sources

 
 
 
 
 
 
 
 
  ,

Web-sources

Further reading
.

Buddhist symbols
Metaphors
Nondualism
Philosophical analogies
Weapons in Hindu mythology